Stephanie Radok (born 1954) is an artist and writer based in Adelaide, South Australia, whose work is held in the National Gallery of Australia and the National Gallery of Victoria. She worked as a general editor for Artlink and as an art critic for Artlink, Adelaide Review, and Art Monthly Australia.

Biography 
Radok was born in Melbourne, Australia, in 1954. Radok studied a degree in Visual Arts, with a major in Printmaking, at the Canberra School of Art from 1982 to 1985.  In 2002 she completed a Master of Arts in Visual Art at the South Australian School of Art.

Radok’s writing about art is linked to memoir and the everyday, lyrical passages and descriptions of artworks. Radok’s writing was first published in the art magazine Unreal City, which she founded with eX de Medici in 1986 in Canberra. She has written many catalogue essays including a notable one for Hossein Valamanesh titled Fingers of Memory.

Art practice 
Radok has held 19 solo exhibitions.

Her work has been exhibited in group exhibitions from 1977,  with an artwork in The Women’s Show held by the Women's Art Movement in Adelaide in 1977. A major survey exhibition titled The Sublingual Museum was held at the Flinders University Museum of Art in 2011.

Radok is the co-author of a book published in 2007 on leading contemporary Australian jeweller Julie Blyfield.

In 2012 Radok’s book An Opening: twelve love stories about art was published by Wakefield Press. It was long listed for the inaugural Stella Prize for writing by women, and was widely reviewed.

"Radok shows how art reaches deeply into our lives in unexpected and ordinary ways: the tattered calendar cutting kept for decades and left behind in a photocopier, the postcard stuck to a laundry wall, or the persistent memory of something, seen perhaps only briefly, that alters one’s thinking utterly." Dr Michele McCrea, Transnational Literature.

Radok’s second memoir, Becoming a Bird, was published in March 2021.

Selected solo exhibitions 
 2020 The Museum of Domestic Botany, Fabrik, Lobethal, SA
 2017 A Prospect of Prospects, Prospect Gallery, SA
 2011 The Sublingual Museum, Flinders University City Gallery
 2004 Brightness falls from the air, N Gallery, South Australian School of Art, SA
 2004 Shalom, Nexus Window, Adelaide, SA
 2003 The Weight of Words, South Australian Museum

 2003 Migration and local knowledge, Gabriel Gallery, Melbourne, Victoria

 2002 Talking about country, Adelaide Botanic Gardens, Adelaide, SA
 1999 Her native tongue, Gallery Spain, Contemporary Art Centre, Adelaide, SA

Collections 
 National Gallery of Australia
 National Gallery of Victoria
 Flinders University Art Museum

References

External links 
 
 Folio with Guildhouse

1954 births
Living people
20th-century Australian women artists
20th-century Australian writers
21st-century Australian women artists
21st-century Australian writers
Artists from Melbourne
Australian women writers
University of South Australia alumni